Novokrasino is a rural locality (a selo) in Osichkovskoye Rural Settlement, Rudnyansky District, Volgograd Oblast, Russia. The population was 122 as of 2010.

Geography 
Novokrasino is located east from the Shchelkan River, 15 km north of Rudnya (the district's administrative centre) by road. Osichki is the nearest rural locality.

References 

Rural localities in Rudnyansky District, Volgograd Oblast